Nancy C. Unger is an American history professor and author. She chairs the history department at Santa Clara University. She has written books on American women in the environmental movement, Bob La Follette, and Belle La Follette.

She was born in Seattle and graduated from Gonzaga University in 1978. She received her masters and Ph.D. from the University of Southern California.

She has appeared on C-Span several times. She discussed Bob La Follette on PBS North Carolina.

Unger suggested Belle La Follette appear on a newly designed $10 bill. She supports a California law requiring the teaching of LGBT history in public schools.

Selected works
Fighting Bob La Follette: The Righteous Reformer
Belle La Follette: Progressive Era Reformer
Beyond Nature's Housekeepers: American Women in Environmental History
A Companion to the Gilded Age and Progressive Era, co-editor with Christopher McKnight Nichols

References

External links 

American women historians
Historians from California
Year of birth missing (living people)
Living people
21st-century American women writers
21st-century American historians
Santa Clara University faculty
Gonzaga University alumni
University of Southern California alumni